The Cambridge University Botanic Garden is a botanical garden located in Cambridge, England, associated with the university Department of Plant Sciences (formerly Botany School). It lies between Trumpington Road to the west, Bateman Street to the north and Hills Road to the east.

The garden covers an area of 16 hectares (40 acres). The site is almost entirely on level ground and in addition to its scientific value, the garden is highly rated by gardening enthusiasts. It holds a plant collection of over 8,000 plant species from all over the world to facilitate teaching and research.  The garden was created for the University of Cambridge in 1831 by Professor John Stevens Henslow (Charles Darwin's mentor) and was opened to the public in 1846.

The third-highest temperature recorded in the UK, 38.7 °C (101.7 °F), was recorded on 25 July 2019 at the garden.

History

Walkerian Garden

After several unsuccessful attempts during the 16th, 17th, and early 18th centuries, a University Botanic Garden was finally established at Cambridge between 1760 and 1763. This was not on the site of the present Garden, but in the centre of the town, on about 5 acres of land then occupied by 'The Mansion House' of the old Augustinian friary, and today by the New Museums Site and other university buildings. It was Dr. Richard Walker, Vice-Master of Trinity College, who, on the advice of Philip Miller of the Chelsea Physic Garden, purchased the property for £1,600, and presented it to the University for use as a Botanic Garden. For some years the Garden was known as the Walkerian Botanic Garden, and there is, at the present Garden, a Walkerian Society named in honour of its founder.

The Walkerian Garden was laid out and developed by the then professor of botany, Thomas Martyn. This small Garden was conceived as a typical Renaissance physic garden, inspired by the Chelsea Physic Garden in London. It grew herbaceous plants used in the teaching of medical students at the University. Glasshouses and a lecture room for the professor were built and the teaching of botany in Cambridge, which was then at a low ebb, received, for a time, a considerable stimulus. This improvement, however, did not last for long. Martyn left in 1798 and only visited Cambridge only occasionally until his death in 1825. About 1790 James Donn was appointed Curator and in 1796 he published the first edition of Hortus Cantabrigiensis, a list of the plants in the Garden which reached its 13th edition in 1845, long after Donn's death.

Botanic Garden

In 1825 John Stevens Henslow, Charles Darwin's teacher at Cambridge, succeeded Martyn as professor of botany and soon realized that a larger site, farther from the centre of Cambridge, was desirable for the Botanic Garden. In 1831 the University purchased the present site of about 40 acres to the south of the town on the Trumpington Road, and in 1846 the first tree was planted. It had been the intention to lay out the whole 40 acres as a Botanic Garden, but presumably funds were lacking, and in fact only 20 acres were planted, the remainder being let out as allotments.

The planning of the new Garden was carried out by Professor Henslow, assisted by young Cardale Babington. The land was flat and unpromising as a garden site, but the layout was planned with great skill, utilizing an old gravel pit to construct a lake with a high mound running into it. Trees and shrubs were planted according to their botanical sequence, a range of glasshouses was built in the 1860s, and a rock garden, one of the earliest of its kind in the country, was constructed about the same time. The Garden has also long been known for its many fine specimens of rare trees. By the 1870s the main features of the Garden had been developed and, it was ready to play its part in the great expansion of botanical teaching and research that was about to take place at Cambridge. During the early years of the 20th century much of the pioneer work of William Bateson, Charles Chamberlain Hurst, and Edith Rebecca Saunders on plant genetics was carried out at the Garden, and it was later used for researches on plant physiology by Frederick Blackman and George Edward Briggs, and on plant pathology by Frederick Tom Brooks and others.

On 25 July 2019, a new UK temperature record at the time (beaten again in 2022) was set at 38.7C (101.7F) within the gardens, which exceeded the previous record of 38.5C (101.3F) set in Faversham on 10 August 2003.

Between 1954 and February 2022 the Botanic Garden was home to the  Isaac Newton tree. The tree was a Flower of Kent grown from a cutting of the tree that dropped the apple that Newton claimed inspired him to produce his theory of gravity. The tree was blown down in Storm Eunice.

Research

The chair of Botany at the University of Cambridge was created in 1724 for Richard Bradley (1724–1732). As of 2016, fifteen botanists have held that position, including John Martyn (1733–1762), John Stevens Henslow (1825–1861) and Harry Marshall Ward (1895–1906) (see list). In 1991 the Botany School was renamed the Department of Plant Sciences. In 2005 the title was changed to Regius Professor of Botany, the appointment as of 2016 is that of Professor Sir David Baulcombe. The current Plant Sciences building on the Downing Site was constructed in 1904 during Ward's tenure, when the main areas of research were  morphology, systematics, pathology and physiology. Morphologists in that period included Agnes Arber, John Corner, and Kenneth Sporne, whose phylogenetic approach was well ahead of the seminal work of Willi Hennig.

In 1921 the University appointed H. Gilbert-Carter as the first scientific Director of the Garden, in conjunction with the curatorship of the herbarium and who published the first guide to the garden. Amongst other directors of the garden were John Gilmour (1951–1973), and Max Walters (1973–1983) who published a history of the garden in 1981. The current director is Beverley Glover (2013–) (see list).

The newly built Sainsbury Laboratory Cambridge University (SLCU) in the grounds of the garden is a highly collaborative and interdisciplinary new research institute. Focusing on the regulatory systems underlying plant growth and development, the Lab uses cutting edge scientific resources and predictive computational models to further understand of the dynamic, self-organising properties of plants. It was funded by Lord Sainsbury, chancellor of the university, and opened by Queen Elizabeth II in April 2011. It houses the university herbarium, moved from the Downing Site in 2011.

Garden features 

 Autumn colour garden
 Bed of British native plants
 Dry garden — demonstrates planting requiring reduced watering
 Fen display
 Genetics garden
 Glasshouses, containing about 3,000 species, have been restored and almost entirely replanted to display  global plant diversity, and comprise:
Continents Apart,  comparing and contrasting the fire dependent, floristically rich plant communities of South Africa and SW Australia, once conjoined in the supercontinent Gondwana
Oceanic Islands, exploring the floral diversity peculiar to island archipelagos
Mountains, exploring how plants survive life in a cold climate
Tropical Rainforests, a hotbed of competition
Carnivores, displaying the diversity of traps in carnivorous plants
Arid Lands, displaying drought tolerant plants from continental Africa and the Americas, including many succulent and cactus species, and demonstrating the phenomenon of convergent evolution.
Life Before Flowers, full of ferns and filmy ferns.
 Herbaceous borders
 Garden Research Plots for various projects or growing single genera
 Lake 
National plant collections of:
Alchemilla
Bergenia
European Fritillaria
Lonicera
Ribes
Ruscus
Saxifraga
Species Tulips
Hardy Geraniums
Important scientific and research collections of:
Lavender
 Rock gardens — for alpine plants
Limestone rock garden
Sandstone rock garden
 Scented garden
 Systematic beds — 144 island beds representing 80 families of flowering plants
 Tree collection
 Water garden
 Winter garden (December to April)
 Woodland garden — containing spring bulbs

Cory Lodge and Lawn

Cory Lodge was built in 1924-5 with money given to the University by Reginald Cory, an alumnus of Trinity College, Cambridge and was originally used as the residence of the Director of the Botanic Garden. Adjacent to Cory Lodge is a superb specimen of Catalpa speciosa, an Indian bean tree from North America, with white flowers followed by long slender fruits. On the north wall of the house is a specimen of Ginkgo biloba, the Chinese maidenhair tree, trained as an espalier since 1987.

See also 
 Director, Cambridge University Botanic Garden
 Regius Professor of Botany (Cambridge)
 List of botanical gardens in the United Kingdom
 List of botanical gardens
 University of Oxford Botanic Garden
 Sainsbury Laboratory Cambridge University

References

Bibliography

Books and articles 
 
 , in 
 , in 
 , in 
 , in 
 
 
 
 
 
 Cover

Websites 
 
 
 Library

External links

Official website

1831 establishments in England
Botanical gardens in England
Botanical research institutes
Botanic Garden
Gardens in Cambridgeshire
Grade II* listed parks and gardens in Cambridgeshire
Botanic Garden
University Botanic Garden
Botanic Garden
University Botanic Garden
Botanic Garden